Janina is a given name, a feminine analog of Jan.

Women named Janina include:
Janina Andersson (born 1971), Finnish politician
Janina Bauman (1926–2009), Polish journalist and writer of Jewish origin
Janina Dłuska (1899–1932), Russian Empire-born Polish artist, illustrator
Janina Fialkowska (born 1951), Canadian classical pianist
Janina Fry (born 1973), Finnish pop singer and model
Janina Garscia (1920–2004), Polish composer, pianist, and music teacher
Janina Gavankar (born 1980), American actress and musician
Janina Hettich (born 1996), German biathlete
Janina Stronski (born 1946), Canadian-American TV talk show host better known as Jenny Jones (presenter)
Janina Ochojska (born 1955), Polish humanitarian activist, Member of the European Parliament
Janina Orlov (born 1955), Finnish-Swedish translator of literature
Janina Oyrzanowska-Poplewska (1918–2001), Polish academic and veterinarian
Janina Paradowska (1942–2016), Polish journalist
Janina Ramirez (born 1980), British art historian and TV presenter
Janina Szymkowiak (1910–1942), Polish nun, beatified by the Catholic Church
Janina Żejmo (1909–1987), Soviet actress

See also
Janina (disambiguation)
Polish feminine given names